Robert Hooks (born Bobby Dean Hooks; April 18, 1937) is an American actor, producer, and activist.  Along with Douglas Turner Ward and Gerald S. Krone, he founded The Negro Ensemble Company. The Negro Ensemble Company is credited with the launch of the careers of many major black artists of all disciplines, while creating a body of performance literature over the last thirty years, providing the backbone of African-American theatrical classics. Additionally, Hooks is the sole founder of two significant black theatre companies: the D.C. Black Repertory Company, and New York's Group Theatre Workshop.

Biography

Early life
The youngest of five children, Hooks was born in Foggy Bottom, Washington, D.C. to Mae Bertha (née Ward), a seamstress, and Edward Hooks who had moved from Rocky Mount, North Carolina with their four other children, Bernice, Caroleigh, Charles Edward "Charlie", and James Walter "Jimmy". Named Bobby Dean Hooks at birth, Robert was their first child born up north and the first to be born in a hospital. His father, Edward, died in a work accident on the railroad in 1939.

Hooks attended Stevens Elementary School. In 1945, at the insistence of his sister Bernice who was doing community arts outreach for youngsters at Francis Junior High School, he performed the lead in his first play, The Pirates of Penzance, at the age of nine. From the ages of 6 to 12, Bobby Dean journeyed with his siblings to Lucama, North Carolina to work the tobacco fields for his uncle's sharecropping farm as a way to help earn money for the coming school year in D.C.

In 1954, just as Brown vs. Board of Education was being implemented in the north, he moved to Philadelphia to be with his mother, her second husband, and his half-sister, Safia Abdullah (née Sharon Dickerson). Hooks experienced his first integrated school experience at West Philadelphia High School. Hooks soon joined the drama club and began acting in plays by William Shakespeare and Samuel Beckett. He was graduated in 1956, passing on a scholarship to Temple University in order to pursue a career as a stage actor at the Bessie V. Hicks School of Theatre (alongside Charles Dierkop and Bruce Dern, with whom he second-acted plays doing their pre-Broadway tryouts in Philadelphia) while working at Browning King, a men's tailor shop at Fourteenth and Chestnut streets.

Career
Having trained at the Bessie V. Hicks School of Theatre in Philadelphia, and after seeing A Raisin in the Sun in its Philadelphia tryout in February 1959, Hooks moved to New York to pursue acting. In April 1960, as Bobby Dean Hooks, he made his Broadway debut in A Raisin in the Sun replacing Louis Gossett Jr. who would be doing the film version. He then continued to do its national tour. He then stepped into the Broadway production of A Taste of Honey, replacing Billy Dee Williams; then repeating the same national tour trajectory as he had done for "Raisin..." the previous year. In early 1962 he next appeared as the lead in Jean Genet's The Blacks, replacing James Earl Jones as the male lead, leaving briefly that same year to appear on Broadway again in Tiger, Tiger, Burning Bright before stepping back into the lead role in The Blacks in 1963. He then returned to Broadway, first in Ballad for Bimshire and then in the short-lived 1964 David Merrick revival of The Milk Train Doesn't Stop Here Any More (as a character created by Tennessee Williams for this revival) and starring Tallulah Bankhead and Tab Hunter in his only stage performance. Immediately thereafter, on March 24, 1964 he originated the role of Clay in Amiri Baraka's Dutchman. With this play, on the advice of Roscoe Lee Brown, Hooks became known as, Robert Hooks. He also originated roles on the New York stage in Where's Daddy? for which he won the Theatre World Award and he was nominated for Best Male Lead in a Musical for Hallelujah Baby while he was simultaneously starring in David Susskind's N.Y.P.D.—the first African American lead on a television drama.

In 1968 Hooks was the host of the new public affairs television program, Like It Is.

Hooks was nominated for a Tony for his lead role in the musical, Hallelujah, Baby!, has received both the Pioneer Award and the NAACP Image Award for Lifetime Achievement, and has been inducted into the Black Filmmakers Hall of Fame. He also won an Emmy for his PBS special, Voices of Our People.

Significant roles for which Hooks is known include Reeve Scott in Hurry Sundown (1967), Mr. T. in the blaxploitation film Trouble Man (1972), grandpa Gene Donovan in the comedy Seventeen Again (2000), and Fleet Admiral Morrow in Star Trek III: The Search for Spock (1984). He also appeared on television in an episode of the NBC crime drama series The Eddie Capra Mysteries in 1978 and portrayed Doctor Walcott in the 1980s television series Dynasty.

Activism

Arts and Culture

In 1964, as a result of a speaking engagement at the Chelsea Civil Rights Committee (then connected to the Hudson Guild Settlement House) he founded The Group Theatre Workshop, a tuition-free environment for disadvantaged urban teens who expressed a desire to explore acting. Among the instructors were Barbara Ann Teer, Frances Foster, Hal DeWindt, Lonne Elder III, and Ronnie Mack. Alumni include Antonio Fargas, Hattie Winston, and Daphne Maxwell Reid.

The Group Theatre Workshop was folded into the tuition-free training arm of the Negro Ensemble Company founded in 1967 with Douglas Turner Ward and Gerald S. Krone with a $1.3 million grant from the Ford Foundation under the auspices of W. McNeil Lowry.

From 1969 to 1972, Hooks served as an original board member of Black Academy of Arts and Letters, located in New York, alongside C. Eric Lincoln, President; John O. Killens, Alvin F. Poussaint, and Charles White. Chartered by the State of New York, its mission was to bring together black artists and scholars from around the world. Additional members included Julian Adderley, Alvin Ailey, Margaret Walker, James Baldwin, Imamu Baraka, Romare Bearden, Harry Belafonte, Lerone Bennett, Arna Bontemps, Ossie Davis, Ruby Dee Davis, St. Clair Drake, Ernest Dunbar, Katherine Dunham, Lonne Elder III, Duke Ellington, Alex Haley, Ruth Inge Hardison, Vertis Hayes, Chester Himes, Lena Horne, Jacob Lawrence, Elma Lewis, Henry Lewis, Paule Marshall, Donald McKayle, Arthur Mitchell, Frederick O’Neal, Gordon Parks, Sidney Poitier, Benjamin Quarles, Lloyd Richards, Lucille D. Roberts, and Nina Simone.

In response to his hometown 1968 Washington, D.C., riots, in the wake of the assassination of Martin Luther King Jr., and aided by a small grant from the Eugene and Agnes E. Meyer Foundation, Hooks took a leave of absence from the Negro Ensemble Company to create The D.C. Black Repertory Company (1970–1981). The company was intended as a further exploration of the ability of the arts to create healing. The a capella group Sweet Honey in the Rock was created and developed within its workshop process.

The Inner Voices (Lorton Prison arts training program, 1971) proved to be a result of the beneficial effect of the repertory company in the D.C. area. In response to a direct plea from an inmate, Rhozier "Roach" Brown, who was serving a life sentence in Lorton, Hooks' D.C. Black Repertory Company structured the first prison-based arts program in the United States. While it is the norm now, it was then a revolutionary attempt at rehabilitation through the arts. Eventually The Inner Voices performed more than 500 times in other prisons, including a Christmas special entitled, "Holidays, Hollowdays." Due to Roach's work, President Gerald Ford commuted his sentence on Christmas Day, 1975.

His relocation to the West Coast redirected Hooks' approach to parity in the arts with his involvement with The Bay Area Multicultural Arts Initiative (1988) as a board member and grant facilitator-judge. Funded by monies from a unique coalition made up of the San Francisco Foundation (a community foundation); Grants for the Arts of the San Francisco Hotel Tax Fund, and The National Endowment for the Arts, the function of this organization was the funding of deserving local multicultural arts organizations.

In 1992, Hooks co-founded (with writer Lonne Elder III) Arts in Action. Located in South Central Los Angeles, this was a film and television training center established to guide individuals who aspired to careers in film production. It formulated strategies and training for securing entry-level jobs. Courses included: career development workshops; pre-production and production for film and television; creative problem solving in production management; directing for stage and screen—principles and practices; also the craft of assistant directors, script supervisor, technicians, wardrobe, make-up, etc.

The Negro Ensemble Company of Los Angeles (1994–1997) was created because so many New York members and original members had relocated to the West Coast. Hooks, as founder and executive director, asked Denise Nicholas, Denzel Washington, James Earl Jones, Laurence Fishburne, Richard Roundtree, Samuel L. Jackson, all alumni from New York Negro Ensemble Company to serve as board members. The goal of the Negro Ensemble Company of Los Angeles was to be a new and innovative multi-ethnic cultural project that strived to achieve the community effectiveness and professional success of its parent organization.

Personal life
Hooks is the father of actor, television and film director Kevin Hooks. He married Lorrie Gay Marlow (actress, author, artist) on June 15, 2008. Previously, he was married to Yvonne Hickman and Rosie Lee Hooks.

In 2021, Emory University began adding to its official archives material documenting Hooks' career, including scripts, printed material, contracts and financial records, notes, correspondence, writings, books and periodicals, audiovisual and digital files.

Awards
 1966 – Theatre World Award (1965–66) for "Where's Daddy?" (The Billy Rose Theatre)
 1979 – American Black Achievement Award – Ebony Magazine
 1982 – Emmy Award for Producing (1982) Voices of Our People: In Celebration of Black Poetry (KCET-TV/PBS)
 1966 – Tony Nomination, Lead Role in a Musical for Hallelujah, Baby
 1985 – Inducted into The Black Filmmakers Hall of Fame, recipient Oscar Micheaux Award (1985)  
 1986 – March 2 declared Robert Hooks Day by the City of Los Angeles, Mayor Tom Bradley
 1987 – Excellence in Advertising and Communications to Black Communities from CEBA (Excellence in Advertising and Communications to Black Communities)
 2000 – Honorary Doctor of Humane Letters, Honoris Causa honorary degree, Bowie State University
 2000 – May 25 declared Robert Hooks Day in Washington, D.C.
 2005 – Beverly Hills/Hollywood Chapter NAACP Image Award for Lifetime Achievement
 2005 – Beverly Hills/Hollywood Chapter NAACP Trailblazer Award to the Negro Ensemble Company 
 2005 – Trailblazer Award – City of Los Angeles
 2006 – The Black Academy of Arts and Letters (TBAAL), Lifetime Achievement Award (Dallas)
 2007 – The Black Theatre Alliance Awards / Lifetime Achievement Award
 2015 – Living Legend Award (2015)  National Black Theatre Festival 
 2018 – October 18 proclaimed Robert Hooks Day by Mayor Muriel Bowser, Washington, D.C.
 2018 – Hooks is entered into The Congressional Record  by the Hon. Eleanor Holmes Norton, September 4, 2018, Vol. 164 
 2018 – Visionary Founder and Creator Award – D.C. Black Repertory Company on its 47th anniversary

Acting credits

Film
 1967 Sweet Love, Bitter as Keel Robinson
 1967 Hurry Sundown as Reeve Scott
 1970 Last of the Mobile Hot Shots "Chicken"
 1970 Carter's Army as Lieutenant Edward Wallace
 1972 Trouble Man as "Mr. T"
 1975 Aaron Loves Angela as Beau
 1977 Airport '77 as Eddie
 1982 Fast-Walking as William Galliot
 1984 Star Trek III: The Search for Spock as Admiral Morrow
 1992 Passenger 57 as FBI Agent Dwight Henderson
 1993 Posse as David "King David" Lee
 1996 Fled as Lieutenant Henry Clark

Television
 1967-1969 N.Y.P.D. as Detective Jeff Ward
 1969-1974 The F.B.I. as Wilcox / Steven Harber
 1969 Mannix as Floyd Brown
 1969 Then Came Bronson as Henry Tate
 1970 The Bold Ones as Scott Dayton
 1971 The Man and the City
 1973 The Rookies as Barney Miller
 1973 McMillan and Wife as Sam
 1974 Marcus Welby, M.D. as Joe Lucas
 1974 The Streets of San Francisco as Joe Joplin
 1975 Police Story as Detective Ernie Tillis
 1975 Petrocelli as Dave Hill
 1976 Just an Old Sweet Song (1976 Film) (television Movie) as Nate Simmons
 1979 Backstairs at the White House (television mini-series) as John Mays, Doorman
 1979 Trapper John, M.D. as Sykes
 1980 The Facts of Life as Mr. Ramsey
 1980 The White Shadow as Dr. Luther Tucker
 1983 WKRP in Cincinnati as Prosecutor
 1983-1988 Hotel as Joe Durran / Frank "Squire" Vance
 1983 T. J. Hooker as Police Lieutenant Peter Ellis
 1984 Dynasty as Dr. Walcott
 1985 V as George Caniff
 1986 227 (TV series) as Congressman Rivers
 1986-1995 Murder, She Wrote (television series) as Kendall Ames / Everett Charles Jensen
 1989 A Different World as Phillip Dalton
 1992 Out All Night as Cliff Emory
 1993 Reasonable Doubts as Kane
 1993 L.A. Law as Judge Earl Gregory
 1993 The Fresh Prince of Bel-Air as Dean Morgan
 1993 The Sinbad Show as Mr. Winters
 1994-1995 M.A.N.T.I.S. as Mayor Lew Mitchell
 1994 Family Matters as Dr. Smiley
 1994-1995 Seinfeld as Joe Temple
 1995 The Commish as Captain M.A. Daniels
 1996 Diagnosis Murder as City Attorney Andrew Chivers
 1997 The Parent 'Hood as Lawrence
 1999 Clueless as Benjamin Davenport
 1999 The Hoop Life (television movie) as Joe Sherman
 2000 Seventeen Again (television movie) as Grandpa Gene Donovan

References

External links
 
 
 
 
 DCN Presents: The Robert Hooks Story DCN Presents: The Robert Hooks Story - YouTube
 Icon: All hail actor and cultural architect Robert Hooks Icon: All hail actor and cultural architect Robert Hooks
 Robert Hooks – I For Color Robert Hooks
 Emory University - Robert Hooks Collection

[https://youtu.be/dqHBe0lsFKk] DCN Presents: The Robert Hooks Story

1937 births
Living people
African-American male actors
American male film actors
American male soap opera actors
American male stage actors
American male television actors
American theatre managers and producers
Male actors from Washington, D.C.
African-American activists
20th-century American male actors
21st-century American male actors
West Philadelphia High School alumni